Nyankumase Ahenkro is a town in the Central Region. The town is known for the Nyankumase Ahenkro Secondary School.  The school is a second cycle institution.

References

Populated places in the Central Region (Ghana)